The cinema of the Faroe Islands does not have a long history.

The Faroe Islands has a small population, and due to the high initial cost of filmmaking, the islands' cinema history is modest. (On the other hand, writing and book publishing is very popular). The first director of the Faroe Islands was Katrin Ottarsdóttir. Her first film set in the Faroe Islands was Atlantic Rhapsody in 1989. 

However, the first feature films in Faroese language with full Faroese castings ("Rannvà" 1975, "Heystblómur" 1976 and "Pall Fángi" 1977) were made in the mid-seventies by Miguel Marín Hidalgo, a Spaniard who stayed for several years in the Faroe Islands. In July 2015, the three films were screened again in the Feroe Islands, at the Nordic House in Tórshavn, with the presence of its author Miguel Marín Hidalgo. The Faroese National TV, Kringvarp Føroya, broadcast "Rannvá" on 25 and 27 December 2016 and "Heystblómur" on 1 and 3 January 2017.

Recently self-taught Johan Rimestad directed the self-financed feature Karrybollarnir, which takes place in Tórshavn.

In 2012 the first Faroese film prize was established, it is called Geytin. The young Faroese director Sakaris Stórá won the first award for his short film Summarnátt (Summer night). In 2013 he directed a new short film Vetrarmorgun (Winther morning), which was awarded at the 64th Berlin International Film Festival.

In 2014 grants for filmmaking were on the Faroese Government Budget (fíggjarlógin) for the first time. 22 applied for a grant, 9 of these received a grant, all together the grants were 485 000 DKK.

This is a list of films concerning the Faroe Islands, either the director is Faroese or the film or parts of it is played in the Faroe Islands:

* 
 1990 - 1700 meter fra fremtiden ("1700 meters far from future" about the remote village Gásadalur), instructor: Ulla Boje Rasmussen.

A 
 1989 - Atlantic Rhapsody - 52 scenes from Tórshavn. Written & directed by Katrin Ottarsdóttir. 74 min. Cast: More than a hundred local actors and non-actors. Trailer on Vimeo

B 
 2003 - Brudepigen - Færgeturen - Jagten på kæledyret
 1997 - Barbara (Denmark) 
 2002 - Burturhugur
 1999 - Bye Bye Blue Bird (road movie). 85 min.  Written & directed by Katrin Ottarsdóttir. Produced by Peter Bech Film. Cast: Hildigunn Eyðfinsdóttir, Sigri Mitra Gaïni, Jóhan í Kollafirði.

D 
 1998 - Dansinn (Iceland)
 2017 - Dreymar við Havið (Dreams by the Sea). A feature film, directed by Sakaris Stórá and written by Marjun Syderbø Kjelnæs. 80 min. Cast: Helena Heðinsdóttir, Juliett Nattestad and Noomi Heradóttir.

E 
 2008 - Ein regla um dagin má vera nokk! (A Line A Day Must Be Enough!). A portrait of the poet ant multi artist Tóroddur Poulsen. 58 min. Directed, shot & edited by Katrin Ottarsdóttir, produced by Blue Bird Film. Trailer on Vimeo
 2008 - Eingin kann gera tað perfekta (No One Can Achieve Perfection). A portrait of the sculptor Hans Pauli Olsen. 85 min. Directed, shot & edited by Katrin Ottarsdóttir, produced by Blue Bird Film. Trailer on Vimeo

F 
 2003 - færøerne.dk

G 

 2016 - Gjógv - millum Norðhavið og Skarðið (Gjógv - between the Norwegian Sea and the Pass)

H 
 1976 - Heystblómur A film by Miguel M. Hidalgo. A modern tale about the impossible love of a schoolgirl and her older teacher.
Cast: Poul Kjartan Bærentsen, Katrin M. Johansen, Finnur Johansen, Ása Lützhöft Dunn.

K 
 2009 - Karrybollarnir A film by Johan Rimestad. A mockumentary about a fictional faroese rockband and their rise to fame. 
Cast: Hallur Hjalgrímsson, Hjálmar Dam, Nikolaj Falk, Turpin N. Djuurhus, Hanna Flóvinsdóttir.

L 
 2014 - Ludo A film directed by Katrin Ottarsdóttir, 71 min. Cast: Lea Blaaberg, Hildigunn Eyðfinsdóttir, Hjálmar Dam, Bárður Persson, Gunnvá Zachariasen.

M 
 1995 - Maðurin ið slapp at fara (The Man Who Was Allowed to Leave), written & directed by Katrin Ottarsdóttir. 58 min. Cast: Sverri Egholm, Adelborg Linklett, Anneli Aeristos Andersson, Eyð Matras, Hilmar Joensen, Kári D. Petersen. Trailer on Vimeo

P 
 1977 - Páll Fangi A film by Miguel M. Hidalgo about a popular Faroese character. Cast: Hans Jacob Hermansen, Kári Petersen, Sofía Sørensen, Jens John Osterø, Fraser Eysturoy,
Høgni Joensen, Benny Samuelsen.

R 
 1975 - Rannvá film version of Dagmar Joensen-Næs novel, produced and directed by Miguel Marín Hidalgo. Cast: Finnur Johansen, Elin Mouritsen, Gudrid H. Nielsen, Jørleif Kúrberg, Róland Samuelsen,
Mortan A. Carlsen, Anna Maria Petersen, Hans Joensen, Fraser Eysturoy and more. Film trailer 1: on Youtube. Film trailer 2: on Youtube

S 
 2009 - Sporini vaksa úr orðum (Traces Grow Out Of Words). A portrait of the writer and poet Jóanes Nielsen. 75 min. Directed, shot & edited by Katrin Ottarsdóttir, produced by Blue Bird Film. Trailer on Vimeo
 2012 - Summarnátt (Summer Night) A Faroese short film directed by Sakaris Stórá, length: 17 min. Cast: Gwenael Akira Helmsdal Carré, Renata Jensen, Armgarð G. Mortensen, Jensina Olsen and more. The film won the first Faroese film award, Geytin.
 2014 - Skuld (Guilt) A Faroese short film directed by Heiðrik á Heygum, length: 30 minutes. The film won two Faroese film awards in December 2014: Geytin and Áskoðaravirðislønin.

T 
 1992 - Tre blink mod vest
 2005 - Trøllini og Mafian A children's film directed by Kári Sverrisson.

V 
 2013 - Vertarmorgun (Winter morning), a short film, directed and written by Sakaris Stórá, produced by Ingun í Skrivarastovu. Length: 19 min.  Cast: Armgarð Mortensen and Helena Heðinsdóttir.

See also

 Cinema of the world
 Kringvarp Føroya (Faroese Broadcasting corporation)

References